Cerobasis amorosa is a species of Psocoptera from the Trogiidae family that is endemic to Cyprus.

References

Trogiidae
Insects described in 1995
Endemic arthropods of Cyprus